Beach Handball competition of the 2022 Central American and Caribbean Beach Games in Santa Marta were held from 20 to 23 November at the Rodadero beach.

Participating teams

Men

Women

Medal summary

Men's tournament

Group A

Knockout stage

Bracket

5th-place game

Final ranking

Women's tournament

Group A

Knockout stage

Bracket

5th-place game

Final ranking

References

External links
 Official Website

Central American and Caribbean Beach Games
2022
Central American and Caribbean Beach Games